José Henrique Rodrigues Marques (born 18 May 1943), known as José Henrique, is a retired Portuguese footballer.

A goalkeeper, he was best known for his successful spell at Benfica, being nicknamed Zé Gato (Joe Cat). He appeared in 299 official games with the club, winning 11 major titles.

Club career
Born in Arrentela, Seixal, Setúbal, José Henrique first played at Amora FC (three seasons), then with Seixal F.C. and Atlético Clube de Portugal (one apiece), all clubs in the Lisbon area. Subsequently, he signed with local S.L. Benfica, where he would remain the following 13 years – he had already played youth football there for two years; he also had a short stint with the Toronto Metros, in the North American Soccer League.

In Benfica's back-to-back Primeira Liga wins from 1971 to 1973, José Henrique was instrumental in helping the squad attain its defensive record: 60 matches with only one loss and 29 goals conceded. He had to share first-choice duties in the next years with another club great, Manuel Bento, eventually losing his position in 1976 after having won eight leagues and three cups; he also appeared in the 1967–68 European Cup final, lost 1–4 to Manchester United in extra time.

From 1979 to 1982, José Henrique competed in the second level with C.D. Nacional (two years) and S.C. Covilhã, retiring at 39. Still active he became a manager with his last team, subsequently returning to Benfica where he went on to work as a goalkeeper coach with the youth sides.

International career
José Henrique played 15 times for Portugal, his debut coming on 10 December 1969 in a 0–1 friendly defeat with England. His last match took place on 13 October 1973 in a 2–2 draw against Bulgaria for the 1974 FIFA World Cup qualifiers – it would also be longtime Benfica teammate Eusébio's last cap.

The peak of José Henrique's international career was at the Brazil Independence Cup in 1972, where he helped the national team finish second to the hosts, only succumbing to a last-minute goal (0–1). During his career, however, he suffered stiff competition from Sporting Clube de Portugal's Vítor Damas.

Honours
Benfica
Primeira Liga: 1967–68, 1968–69, 1970–71, 1971–72, 1972–73, 1974–75, 1975–76, 1976–77
Taça de Portugal: 1968–69, 1969–70, 1971–72
Taça de Honra (4)
European Cup: Runner-up 1967–68

References

External links

1943 births
Living people
People from Seixal
Portuguese footballers
Association football goalkeepers
Primeira Liga players
Liga Portugal 2 players
Amora F.C. players
Seixal F.C. players
Atlético Clube de Portugal players
S.L. Benfica footballers
C.D. Nacional players
S.C. Covilhã players
North American Soccer League (1968–1984) players
Toronto Blizzard (1971–1984) players
Portugal international footballers
Portuguese expatriate footballers
Expatriate soccer players in Canada
Portuguese expatriate sportspeople in Canada
Portuguese football managers
S.C. Covilhã managers
Sportspeople from Setúbal District